Elk Mound High School is a public high school located in Elk Mound, Wisconsin. It is a member of the Dunn-St. Croix Conference.

References

External links 
 Elk Mound School District

Schools in Dunn County, Wisconsin
Educational institutions in the United States with year of establishment missing
Public high schools in Wisconsin